Baptiste Anziani (born 3 May 1990) is a French professional footballer who plays for FC Bastelicaccia.

Career
Born in Toulon, Anziani played three games in the Ligue 2 for SC Bastia, before in summer 2010 signed with USJA Carquefou.

References

External links

 

1990 births
Living people
Association football midfielders
French footballers
Footballers from Corsica
Ligue 2 players
SC Bastia players
USJA Carquefou players
FCA Calvi players
CS Sedan Ardennes players
ÉFC Fréjus Saint-Raphaël players
AS Cannes players